The Billy Graham Library is a public museum and library documenting the life and ministry of Christian evangelist Billy Graham. The  complex opened to the public on June 5, 2007. The library is located on the grounds of the international headquarters of the Billy Graham Evangelistic Association in Charlotte, North Carolina, a few miles from where Graham was reared. The library is styled after a dairy barn, with a mechanical "talking" cow, to reflect Graham's farm-based childhood.

The main galleries within the library showcase numerous presentations, pictures, music, artifacts, and voices from throughout Graham's ministry. One gallery is entirely devoted to Ruth Bell Graham, the wife of the evangelist. There is a dairy bar café and bookstore called "Ruth's Attic." All visitors enter the Library through doors at the base of a  glass cross. Also located on the Library grounds is the Prayer Garden, where Ruth Graham was buried on June 17, 2007.

Ruth Graham initially opposed to being buried at the library, and instead preferred her home at the Billy Graham Training Center at the Cove near Asheville to be her final resting place until just before she died. In March 2009 Wilma "Billie" Barrows, the wife of Billy Graham's longtime Music Director Cliff Barrows, was interred on the Library grounds. In April 2013, Gospel singer and Graham's regular featured soloist George Beverly Shea was interred there as well. Barrows was buried next to his wife on the grounds after his death in November 2016.

Graham's funeral following his February 21, 2018 death was conducted on March 2, 2018 in a tent, similar to the tents where he held his first crusades, on the grounds of the Library. Prior to the funeral, Graham had laid in repose in his childhood homeplace next to the library as well as lying in honor at the United States Capital in Washington, D.C. Following the funeral, Graham was buried next to his wife in the Library's Prayer Garden.

See also 
 List of Billy Graham's crusades

Notes

References
 Reuters
  
 https://www.usatoday.com/news/religion/2007-05-31-billy-graham-library_N.htm?csp=34 
 
 http://news14.com/content/special_edition/billy_graham_library_dedication/Default.aspx

External links

 Billy Graham Library
 Billy Graham Evangelistic Association
 Samaritan's Purse

Libraries in North Carolina
Museums in Charlotte, North Carolina
Graham, Billy
Religious museums in North Carolina
Billy Graham